Hugh B. Scott (born 1949 in Amherst, New York) is a magistrate judge of United States District Court for the Western District of New York.  He was appointed United States Magistrate Judge on June 1, 1995.

Scott was the first African American to become assistant attorney general in charge in Western New York, as well as the first African American to become assistant United States Attorney, assistant corporation counsel and assistant county attorney. At age 32, Scott was elected to the Buffalo City Court. He was re-elected to another 10-year term before leaving the position to become the first African American to sit on the federal bench in the Western District of New York. He died February 20, 2021.

Scott received his B.A. from Niagara University in 1971 and his J.D. from the University at Buffalo Law School in 1974.

References

External links
Judge Scott's profile on the District Court website

1949 births
Living people
University at Buffalo Law School alumni
Niagara University alumni
United States Attorneys for the Western District of New York
United States magistrate judges